Pontardawe Festival is an annual festival of world music and dance which is held every August on the playing fields in Pontardawe, Wales, UK.

The festival is run by volunteers on a not-for-profit basis and has been held every year with one exception since it first started in 1978.

It has received funding in the past from the Arts Council of Wales, but in 2006 the council decided to reduce funding to the festival and ask it to apply for lottery funding instead.

Pontardawe got lottery funding in 2006

References

South Wales Guardian, Thursday 1st Aug 2002 - Pontardawe Festival
Menter Iaith Castell Nedd Port Talbot  - Pontardawe Festival
BBC News - Thursday, 23 November 2006, 13:28 GMT Warning of arts funding struggle

City and County of Swansea - Library Bookfest at Pontardawe Festival

Music festivals in Wales
Media and culture in Neath Port Talbot
Recurring events established in 1978